Senate elections were held in Liberia on 20 December 2014, with half the seats in the Senate up for election.

Background
The elections were originally scheduled to be held on 14 October 2014, as defined by the constitution. However, they were postponed until 16 December due to the Ebola epidemic. Shortly before 16 December, they were postponed again until 20 December.

Campaign
In early December President Ellen Johnson Sirleaf banned political rallies, claiming that they could cause the Ebola virus to spread.

A total of 139 candidates ran for the 15 seats. Fourteen parties nominated candidates, with 26 people standing as independents. Among the candidates were former footballer George Weah of the Congress for Democratic Change, who won the Montserrado County election and sat in the Senate until his election as president in 2017.

Results

References

External links
Candidate List  National Elections Commission

2014 in Liberia
Elections in Liberia
Liberia
December 2014 events in Africa